Harry Clinton Warner (December 11, 1928 – April 11, 2015) was an American coach in Major League Baseball and a former first baseman and manager at the minor league level.

Warner's 17-year playing career (1946–62) peaked at the Double-A level. He spent much of his active career in the farm systems of the Boston Braves/Milwaukee Braves and the Washington Senators. In his finest season, 1954, he batted .317 with 17 home runs for the Salem Senators of the Class A Western International League. Overall, he hit .279 in 1,671 minor league games with 147 home runs.

He remained with the organization (the Minnesota Twins after the 1960 campaign) and managed at all levels of the minor leagues through 1976. The following season, he joined the coaching staff of the first Blue Jay manager, Roy Hartsfield, and worked with him for three seasons. In , Hartsfield was succeeded by Bobby Mattick as Toronto's manager, and Warner managed the Jays' Triple-A Syracuse Chiefs farm club of the International League before rejoining the Toronto coaching staff for the final month of the season.

In , he became the third-base coach of the Brewers and in his two seasons in that post the Brewers made the 1981 playoffs, then won the 1982 AL pennant. His managing career concluded with a return to the Twins' organization in 1983, when he led the Class A Visalia Oaks of the California League to a division title. One of his players that season with future Twins star Kirby Puckett.

All told, Warner accumulated 1,129 wins and 1,067 losses (.514) in 19 seasons as a minor league manager.  Later in the 1980s, Warner scouted for the Twins and then the San Diego Padres, based in Reeders, Monroe County, Pennsylvania. He died at age 86 in Reeders.

References

External links
 Minor league playing and managing statistics, from Baseball Reference
 MLB coaching career, from Retrosheet

1928 births
2015 deaths
Austin Senators players
Charlotte Hornets (baseball) players
Eau Claire Bears players
Erie Sailors players
Evansville Braves players
Jacksonville Braves players
Major League Baseball bullpen coaches
Major League Baseball third base coaches
Milwaukee Brewers coaches
Minnesota Twins scouts
People from Monroe County, Pennsylvania
Salem Senators players
San Diego Padres scouts
Stroudsburg Poconos players
Syracuse Chiefs managers
Toronto Blue Jays coaches
Wilson Tobs players